The 1924 Centenary Gentlemen football team represented the Centenary College of Louisiana during the 1924 college football season. Players included Cal Hubbard and Swede Anderson. The team posted an 8–1 record, including an upset win over Frank Cavanaugh's Boston College team.

Schedule

References

Centenary
Centenary Gentlemen football seasons
Centenary Gentlemen football